Hopewell (also, Ira and Mulberry) is a former unincorporated community in Red River County, Texas, United States.

References

Geography of Red River County, Texas
Ghost towns in North Texas